Émile Bongiorni (19 March 1921 – 4 May 1949) was a French association football striker of Italian descent.

He played for RC Paris where he was capped 5 times for France. In 1948, he moved to Torino F.C., with another Frenchman of Italian descent, Roger Grava of CO Roubaix-Tourcoing. They both died in the Superga air disaster on 4 May 1949.

Honours

Club
Torino
Serie A: 1948–49

References
 Profile on French federation official site

External links
 
 

1921 births
1949 deaths
French people of Italian descent
French footballers
France international footballers
Association football forwards
Racing Club de France Football players
Ligue 1 players
Torino F.C. players
Serie A players
French expatriate footballers
Expatriate footballers in Italy
Sportspeople from Boulogne-Billancourt
Footballers from Hauts-de-Seine
Footballers killed in the Superga air disaster